Sidney James Miller (born 1943) is an author, a former Headmaster of Kingston Grammar School, and a former Headmaster of Bedford School.

Biography

Born on 25 January 1943, Sidney Miller was educated at Clifton College, at Jesus College, Cambridge, and at Harvard University. He was Sixth Form Classical Master and House Tutor at Clifton College, between 1965 and 1968, Assistant Master and Classical Tutor at Eton College, between 1968 and 1973, Head of the Classical Department at Eton College, between 1971 and 1973, Headmaster of Kingston Grammar School, between 1977 and 1986, Headmaster of Bedford School, between 1986 and 1988, and Professional Officer at the School Examination and Assessment Council, between 1988 and 1989.

Publications

Greek Unprepared Translation, 1968
Inscriptions of the Roman Empire, AD 14–117, 1971

References

1943 births
Living people
People educated at Clifton College
Alumni of Jesus College, Cambridge
Headmasters of Bedford School
Teachers at Eton College